Gressitt Glacier is a broad glacier, about  long, draining the area between the Daniels Range and the Emlen Peaks in the Usarp Mountains of Victoria Land, Antarctica, and flowing northeast to enter the Rennick Glacier just north of the Morozumi Range. This geographical feature was first mapped by the United States Geological Survey from surveys and U.S. Navy air photos, 1960–63, and was so named by the Advisory Committee on Antarctic Names for biologist J. Linsley Gressitt, Program Director, who made biological studies, particularly in the Ross Sea area, during six austral summers, 1959–60 to 1965–66. The glacier lies situated on the Pennell Coast, a portion of Antarctica lying between Cape Williams and Cape Adare.

Further reading 
 Paul A. Mayewski, John W. Attig, David J. Drewry, Pattern of Ice Surface Lowering for Rennick Glacier, Northern Victoria Land, Antarctica, Journal of Glaciology, Volume 22, Issue 86 1979, pp. 53–65, DOI: https://doi.org/10.3189/S0022143000014052
 Charles Swithinbank, Antarctica, Issue 1386, Part 2,  P 52

External links 

 Gressitt Glacier on USGS website
 Gressitt Glacier on the Antarctica New Zealand Digital Asset Manager website
 Gressitt Glacier on AADC website
 Gressitt Glacier on SCAR website
 Gressitt Glacier distance calculator

References

Glaciers of Pennell Coast